Manasella Neene is a 2002 Indian Kannada-language romance film directed by Mugur Sundar, a popular choreographer marking his debut in film direction. The film stars his youngest son Nagendra Prasad and Gayathri Raguram (in her Kannada debut) with Ananth Nag and Srinath in supporting roles. This film is the remake of the Telugu film Manasantha Nuvve (2001).

Cast

Nagendra Prasad as Venu (Chintu)
Gayathri Raguram as Renuka
Ananth Nag as the editor-in-chief of a magazine
Srinath as Venu's father
Ambika as Madhavi
Chithra Shenoy as Venu's mother
M. N. Lakshmi Devi
Karibasavaiah as Cyril, Venu's friend
Suja Raghuram as Shruthi
Raju Sundaram as Arun
Sundeep Malani as Venu's friend
B Rakshet as Chintu/younger Venu
Nayana as Anu/younger Renuka
Prabhudeva in a special appearance

Production 
Choreographer Mugur Sundar ventured into direction with this film, which features his son Nagendra Prasad and Gayathri Raghuram in her Kannada debut. Prasad's brother, Prabhu Deva, chose the story from the Telugu film Manasantha Nuvve (2001). The film was launched on 10 December 2001. Dr. Rajkumar and Puneeth Rajkumar came to the film sets as guests. Raghuram's sister Suja and Raju Sundaram play supporting roles. The song featuring Raju Sundaram was choreographed by Prabhu Deva.

Soundtrack
The film's score and soundtrack was composed by Ravi Raj. Four songs were retained from the Telugu version by R. P. Patnaik, including "Jheer Jimbe Jheer Jimbe" which was re-arranged from Vidyasagar's original composition  "Kannadi Koodum Kootti" from Pranayavarnangal (1998).

Release 
A writer from The Times of India called this film "the best movie in Nagendra's career".

References

External links

Kannada remakes of Telugu films
Indian romantic drama films
2002 films
2000s Kannada-language films
2002 directorial debut films
2002 romantic drama films